Gafsa Radio is a public local radio station created on November 7, 1991. It broadcasts from Gafsa city targeting locals of South West Tunisia.

Content
The radio broadcasts 18 hours a day with generic content targeting mainly the audiences of South West Tunisia with diverse programming.

Broadcast
Available only in Southern West of Tunisia. The frequencies vary from region to region. Sometimes the service is available in different frequencies.
 93.5 MHz
 91.8 MHz
 89.2 MHz
 88.3 MHz

Internet
The Internet service is not yet available, but there are some recorded programs on the Tunisian Radio website.

External links
 Tunisia Radio Website

Radio stations in Tunisia
Radio stations established in 1991
1991 establishments in Tunisia